Kathryn M. Albers is an American scientist. She is a professor of neurobiology and medicine at the University of Pittsburgh School of Medicine. She obtained her Ph.D. from Stony Brook University in 1985 and finished her postdoctoral training at the University of Chicago in 1990. She is a Fellow of the American Association for the Advancement of Science. Topics in her research involve the growth and growth factors of skin and nerves.

References

External links

20th-century births
Living people
Stony Brook University alumni
University of Pittsburgh faculty
Fellows of the American Association for the Advancement of Science
21st-century American women scientists